Kunwar (also spelt Kanwar or Kaur or Kuar) is an Indian title denoting a prince. It is derived from the Sanskrit term Kumar.
It was traditionally associated with the feudal Rajputs such as the son of a Rana or Thakur

The following are notable uses of the name Kunwar.

In India
 Babu Kunwar Singh (1777-1858; also known as Babu Kunwar Singh and Kuer Singh), leader during the Indian Rebellion of 1857
 Kunwar Amar, Indian dancer and actor
 Kunwar Narayan (1927-2017), Indian poet
 Kunwar Natwar Singh (born 1931), Indian politician
 Kunwar Vikram Singh (born 1970), Indian royal
 Kunwar Sone Singh Ponwar (died 1816), Indian raja
 Kunwar Manvendra Singh (born 1950), Indian politician
 Kunwar Digvijay Singh (1922-1978), popularly known as "Babu", Indian field hockey player
 Kunwar Sarvraj Singh (born 1952), Indian politician 
 Kunwar Sarvesh Kumar Singh (born 1952), Indian businessman and politician 
 Lal Kunwar, Empress of Mughal Empire 
 Kunwar Pranav Singh (born 1966), Indian politician 
 Kunwar Rewati Raman Singh (born 1943), Indian politician
 Kunwar Singh (cricketer) (1878-1959), first Indian Governor of Bombay, Prime Minister of Jammu and Kashmir (during Maharaja Hari Singh’s rule) and also Dewan of Jodhpur
 Kunwar Jitin Prasad (born 1973), Indian politician
 Anita Kunwar, Indian actor
 Khan Shein Kunwar (born 1955), Indian writer
 Kunwar Bhim Singh (born 1941), Indian politician, activist, lawyer and author
 Kunwar Nau Nihal Singh (1821-1840), ruler of the Punjab region of the Indian subcontinent

In Nepal
Kunwar family of Gorkha, a political Chhetri family of Nepal
 Ram Krishna Kunwar (died 1771), Nepalese warlord during rule of King Prithvi Narayan Shah
 Ranajit Kunwar (1753-c.1815), Nepalese military commander and governor
 Chandrabir Kunwar (died 1814), Nepalese governor and military commander
 Bal Narsingh Kunwar (1783-1841), Nepalese military officer and courtier 
 Balbhadra Kunwar (1789-1823), Nepalese military commander, One of the National heroes of Nepal
 Jung Bahadur Kunwar Rana (1817-1877), Eighth Prime Minister of Nepal and Founder of Rana dynasty in Nepal
 Bam Bahadur Kunwar (1818-1857), Ninth Prime Minister of Nepal
 Ranodip Singh Kunwar (1825-1885), Tenth Prime Minister of Nepal and Fifth Brother of Jung Bahadur
 Dhir Shamsher Kunwar Rana (1828-1884), Commander-in-chief of the Nepalese Army, youngest brother of Jung Bahadur 
 Kunwar Inderjit Singh (1906-1982), 20th Prime Minister of Nepal. Royalty of Doti Region. Born as Indradhwoj Shahi later adopted title of Kunwar
 Uttam Kunwar (1938–1982), Nepalese journalist and writer
 Ramjee Kunwar (born 1956), Trade Union Activist and politician
 Baburam Kunwar (born 1960), first governor of Gandaki Province
 Kabita Kunwar (born 2003), Nepalese cricketer

In Pakistan
 Kunwar Khalid Yunus (born 1964), Pakistani politician
 Kunwar Ali Roshan, Pakistani filmmaker

See also 
 Veer Kunwar Singh University, a university in India
 Kunwar family, Nepalese dynasty of nobles of Gorkha Kingdom

References

Nepali-language surnames
Khas surnames